Rose water is a flavoured water made by steeping rose petals in water. It is the hydrosol portion of the distillate of rose petals, a by-product of the production of rose oil for use in perfume. Rose water is also used to flavour food, as a component in some cosmetic and medical preparations, and for religious purposes throughout Eurasia.

Rose syrup (not to be confused with rose hip syrup) is a syrup made from rose water, with sugar added. Gulkand in South Asia is a syrupy mashed rose mixture.

Central Iran is home to the annual Golabgiri festival each spring. Thousands of tourists visit the area to celebrate the rose harvest for the production of golâb. Iran accounts for 90% of world production of rose water.

History

Since ancient times, roses have been used medicinally, nutritionally, and as a source of perfume.

Rose perfumes are made from rose oil, also called attar of roses, which is a mixture of volatile essential oils obtained by steam-distilling the crushed petals of roses. Rose water is a by-product of this process. The cultivation of various fragrant flowers for obtaining perfumes, including rose water, likely originated in Persia, where it was known as gulāb, from gul ( flower) and ab ( water). The term was adopted into Medieval Greek as zoulápin. The process of creating rose water through steam distillation was refined by Persian chemists in the medieval Islamic world which led to more efficient and economic uses for perfumery industries.

Uses

Food
Rose water is sometimes added to lemonade. It is often added to water to mask unpleasant odours and flavours.

In South Asian cuisine, rose water is a common ingredient in sweets such as laddu, gulab jamun, and peda. It is also used to flavour milk, lassi, rice pudding, and other dairy dishes.

In Malaysia and Singapore, sweet red-tinted rose water is mixed with milk, making a sweet pink drink called bandung.

American and European bakers often used rose water until the 19th century, when vanilla became popular. In Yorkshire, rose water has long been used as a flavouring for the regional specialty, Yorkshire curd tart. 

In Iran, it is added to tea, ice cream, cookies, and other sweets. Rosewater is also used in some savoury dishes, such as Khoresh Gheymé, Shirin Polow (cherry rice), Tahchin or during steaming of Persian rice. 

In Middle Eastern cuisines, rosewater is used in various dishes, especially in sweets such as Turkish delight, nougat, and baklava. Marzipan has long been flavoured with rose water. In Cyprus, Mahaleb's Cypriot version known as μαχαλεπί, uses rose water (ροδόσταγμα). Rose water is frequently used as a halal substitute for red wine and other alcohols in cooking. The Premier League offer a rose water-based beverage as an alternative for champagne when awarding Muslim players. In accordance with the ban on alcohol consumption in Islamic countries, rose water is used instead of champagne on the podium of the Bahrain Grand Prix and Abu Dhabi Grand Prix.

Cosmetics
In medieval Europe, rose water was used to wash hands at a meal table during feasts. Rose water is a usual component of perfume. Rose water ointment is occasionally used as an emollient, and rose water is sometimes used in cosmetics such as cold creams, toners and face wash.

Some people use rose water as a spray applied directly to the face as a perfume and moisturiser, especially during the winter. It is also often sprinkled in Indian weddings to welcome guests.

Religion
Rose water is used in the religious ceremonies of Christianity (in the Eastern Orthodox Church), Zoroastrianism, and Baháʼí Faith (in Kitab-i-Aqdas 1:76).

Composition
Depending on the origin and manufacturing method, rose water is obtained from the sepals and petals of Rosa × damascena through steam distillation. The following monoterpenoid and alkane components can be identified with gas chromatography: mostly citronellol, nonadecane, geraniol and phenyl ethyl alcohol, and also henicosane, 9-nonadecen, eicosane, linalool, citronellyl acetate, methyleugenol, heptadecane, pentadecane, docosane, nerol, disiloxane, octadecane, and pentacosane. Usually, phenylethyl alcohol is responsible for the typical odour of rose water but is not always present in rose water products.

Gallery

See also
Golabgiri
Orange flower water

References

External links

Ancient Greek cuisine
Arab cuisine
Food ingredients
Middle Eastern cuisine
Roses
Syrup
Herbal distillates
Azerbaijani cuisine
Ark of Taste foods
Iranian cuisine
Indian cuisine
Turkish cuisine